The following is a list of equipment used by the Royal Italian Army (Regio Esercito), Italian Air Force (Regia Aeronautica), and Royal Italian Navy (Regia Marina) during World War II.

Bayonets

Small arms

Handguns

Rifles

Submachine guns

Grenades

Flamethrowers 
 Lanciafiamme Modello 35
 Lanciafiamme Modello 41
 Lanciafiamme Modello 41 d'assalto

Machine guns 
 Breda Mod. 5C 6.5 mm heavy machine gun
 Breda Mod. 5G 6.5 mm light machine gun
 Breda 30 6.5 mm light machine gun
 Breda M31 (licensed copy of the 13.2 mm Hotchkiss machine gun)
 Breda 37 8 mm heavy machine gun
 Breda 38 8 mm tank machine gun
 FM 24/29 (ex-French)
 Fiat–Revelli Modello 1914 6.5 mm machine gun
 Fiat–Revelli Modello 1935 8 mm Breda machine gun
 SIA Mod. 1918 6.5 mm heavy machine gun
 Breda-SAFAT 7.7 mm machine gun
 Breda-SAFAT 12.7 mm machine gun
 Scotti–Isotta Fraschini Modello 1933 12.7 mm machine gun

Artillery

Infantry mortars

Field artillery 
Italian artillery was usually designated using the calibre and length of the barrel in number of calibre lengths, so "90/53" would mean a weapon with a 90 mm diameter barrel where the length of the barrel was approximately 53 calibre lengths (i.e. 53x90 mm, that is 4.77 m).

See also:
 203 mm /53 Italian naval gun - main gun on Italian cruisers

Anti-tank guns 
Before and during World War II, Italy designed most of their anti-aircraft guns and some its infantry guns to also serve in the anti-tank role. No dedicated anti-tank gun was produced. Listed below is just the guns used in anti-tank role most commonly.

Infantry anti-tank weapons 
 fucile controcarro 35(P) - Wz. 35 anti-tank rifle captured from Poland
 Solothurn S-18/100 anti-tank rifle
 Solothurn S-18/1000 anti-tank rifle
 Solothurn S-18/1100 anti-tank rifle
 Panzerfaust - one-shot disposable recoilless shaped charge launcher imported from Germany
 Lanciabombe Controcarro 60 mm - HEAT rifle grenade capable of penetrating 70 mm RHA at 80 m

Anti-aircraft weapons 

All calibers of AA guns were also mounted in portee trucks in dual roles (ground attack and AA).

Vehicles 
The Italian designation system for tanks consisted of a letter (L, M or P; designating light, medium and heavy tanks respectively) followed by two numbers: one giving the approximate weight in tons, the other giving the year it was accepted for service. Thus "M11/39" means the 11 ton medium tank of 1939. The Italian definitions of light, medium and heavy tank differ from other nations at the time. For instance the Italian "medium" tanks are often described as "light" in other sources.

Tankettes 

The L3 tankette was also a basis for several engineering vehicles.

Tanks

Self-propelled guns

Tank-based

Others
During World War II, Italy regularly mounted cannons on portee trucks. Also, permanent installation of guns on trucks and armored cars were done on ad-hoc basis, therefore many self-propelled guns had no official name besides descriptive type of truck plus type of cannon. Below is the grossly incomplete list of these self-propelled weapons.
  - cannon installed on truck TL 37
 
 102/35 su Fiat 634N
 
 Autocannoni da 75
 
 Breda Autocannone Blindato Tipo 102
  - Lancia 3 RO Chassis
 AT - SP ATG armed with 37mm cannon
 L.3/Solothurn or L.3/cc (antitank) - changes made on several specimens directly from the operational departments in Italian North Africa in 1941. In place of the twin machine guns an S-18/1000 Solothurn 20 mm anti-tank rifle was mounted, which could penetrate the armor of British armored cars and light tanks.
 Trubia - experimental version of the Spanish armed with a gun Breda 20/65 Mod 1935 20mm.
 Chariot anti-tank gun or self-propelled L3 47/32 - prototype self-propelled gun armed with a 47/32 mm; trying "desperately" to adapt to the new demands of war the L3 Chariot had a very similar design to the Panzerjäger I (which was also derived from the most common light tank in the army of adoption, the Panzer I). The hull, superstructure private, had a front antitank gun 47/32 cowl, which was to protect the crew and the rest of the half was equal to the chassis of L .3, although the photo of the prototype seems that the suspensions were a mainspring. Probably would not be successful, since the recoil while content of 47/32 could, in the long run detrimental to the operation of the medium.

Armoured cars

Engineering and command 
 L.3/r - command tank with radio inside, deployed in all tankette units
 L.3 carro recupero - experimental version for the recovery of damaged vehicles.
 L.3 da demolizione - radio-controlled prototype for the destruction of the minefields.
 L6/40 ammunition carrier
 L6/40 command tank

Trucks

Light trucks 
 
 
 
 
 
 SPA TL.37

Medium trucks 
 Alfa Romeo 430RE
 Alfa Romeo 800RE
 
 
 
 FIAT-626 NM
 Isotta Fraschini D65
 Isotta Fraschini D80
 SPA Dovunque-35
 
 SPA AS.37

Heavy trucks 
 
 FIAT-634N
 FIAT-666
 Fiat 661
 Lancia Ro
 Lancia 3Ro
 Lancia EsaRo
 
 ОМ Titano

Passenger cars 
 Alfa Romeo 6С2500 Coloniale
 Fiat 508CM
 Fiat 1100 (1937) (Balilla-1100 Coloniale)
 
 
 Fiat 2800 CMC

Motorcycles 
 Benelli 500 M36
 Benelli 500 VLM
 Bianchi Supermil 500
 Gilera 500 LTE
 Moto Guzzi Alce
 Moto Guzzi Trialce
 Volugrafo Aermoto 125

Tractors and prime movers 
 L.3 trattore leggero - hypothetical version for towing the gun da. 47/32
  - wheeled artillery tractor
  - half-track artillery tractor
  - wheeled artillery tractor
  - half-track artillery tractor, a licensed copy of the German Sd.Kfz. 7

Miscellaneous vehicles 
 Carro Veloce 29 (armored car) - may be misspelled or fictitious (most likely this is the CV-29 tankette by the same name)

Navy ships and war vessels

Aircraft

Radars 
The Italy was late on the radar development;
At the date of the armistice in 1943, 84 of 85 radars in operation were German-built.
Italian Army and Navy have deployed a network of radar detectors and jammers though.
 ARGO - domestically developed air warning radar in Pratica di Mare Air Base
 FREYA - sold by Germans 1 July 1942, later transported to Sicily
 RTD Arghetto or Vespa - prototype of airborne 300 MHz radar

See also: Armi avanzate della Seconda Guerra Mondiale/Appendix 4 (wikibook)

Cartridges and shells 
 6.5×52mm Mannlicher–Carcano
 7.35×51mm Carcano
8×59mm Rb Breda
 9mm Glisenti

See also
 Military history of Italy during World War II
 Military equipment of Germany's allies on the Balkan and Russian fronts (1941–45)
 Regio Esercito
 List of Regia Aeronautica aircraft used in World War II

References

Further reading

External links
 https://web.archive.org/web/20121006163934/http://mailer.fsu.edu/~akirk/tanks/Italy/ItalianHalfTrack-SupportVehicles.html
 https://web.archive.org/web/20100630113058/http://ww2drawings.jexiste.fr/Files/1-Vehicles/Axis/2-Italy/07-Halftracks/Breda-Typo61/Breda-Typo61.htm
 http://www.kfzderwehrmacht.de/Homepage_english/Motor_Vehicles/Italy/Breda/Breda_Type_61/breda_type_61.html

Military history of Italy during World War II
 
equipment in World War II
Italian
Lists of vehicles